Antelope County is a county located in the U.S. state of Nebraska. As of the 2020 United States Census, the population was 6,295. Its county seat is Neligh. The county was formed in 1871. It received its name after a group of early settlers killed and ate several pronghorn. Although these are not true antelope, they are colloquially known by that name.

The Ashfall Fossil Beds National Natural Landmark is located within the county.

In the Nebraska license plate system, Antelope County is represented by the prefix 26 (it had the 26th-largest number of vehicles registered in the state when the license plate system was established in 1922).

Geography

Adjacent counties

 Pierce County – east
 Madison County – southeast
 Boone County – south
 Wheeler County – southwest
 Holt County – west
 Knox County – north

Major highways

  U.S. Highway 20
  U.S. Highway 275
  Nebraska Highway 13
  Nebraska Highway 14
  Nebraska Highway 45
  Nebraska Highway 70

Protected areas
 Ashfall Fossil Beds State Historical Park

Demographics

As of the 2000 United States Census, there were 7,452 people, 2,953 households, and 2,073 families in the county. The population density was 9 people per square mile (3/km2). There were 3,346 housing units at an average density of 4 per square mile (2/km2). The racial makeup of the county was 98.82% White, 0.05% Black or African American, 0.31% Native American, 0.05% Asian, 0.28% from other races, and 0.48% from two or more races. 0.70% of the population were Hispanic or Latino of any race. 57.9% were of German, 6.6% English, 6.6% American and 5.9% Irish ancestry.

There were 2,953 households, out of which 32.20% had children under the age of 18 living with them, 62.50% were married couples living together, 5.50% had a female householder with no husband present, and 29.80% were non-families. 27.80% of all households were made up of individuals, and 16.20% had someone living alone who was 65 years of age or older. The average household size was 2.49 and the average family size was 3.05.

The county population contained 27.50% under the age of 18, 6.20% from 18 to 24, 23.30% from 25 to 44, 23.20% from 45 to 64, and 19.90% who were 65 years of age or older.  The median age was 41 years. For every 100 females there were 96.80 males. For every 100 females age 18 and over, there were 94.30 males.

The median income for a household in the county was $30,114, and the median income for a family was $36,240. Males had a median income of $26,288 versus $16,926 for females. The per capita income for the county was $14,601. About 10.30% of families and 13.60% of the population were below the poverty line, including 17.20% of those under age 18 and 11.90% of those age 65 or over.

Communities

Cities
 Elgin
 Neligh (county seat)
 Tilden (part)

Villages

 Brunswick
 Clearwater
 Oakdale
 Orchard
 Royal

Townships

 Bazile
 Blaine
 Burnett
 Cedar
 Clearwater
 Crawford
 Custer
 Eden
 Elgin
 Ellsworth
 Elm
 Frenchtown
 Garfield
 Grant
 Lincoln
 Logan
 Neligh
 Oakdale
 Ord
 Royal
 Sherman
 Stanton
 Verdigris
 Willow

Politics
Antelope County voters are strongly Republican. In only one national election since 1916 has the county selected the Democratic Party candidate.

See also
 National Register of Historic Places listings in Antelope County, Nebraska

References

External links

 http://www.co.antelope.ne.us/

 
Nebraska counties
1871 establishments in Nebraska